The 2019 AAA Texas 500 was a Monster Energy NASCAR Cup Series race held on November 3, 2019, at Texas Motor Speedway in Fort Worth, Texas. Contested over 334 laps on the 1.5 mile (2.4 km) intermediate quad-oval, it was the 34th race of the 2019 Monster Energy NASCAR Cup Series season, eighth race of the Playoffs, and second race of the Round of 8.

Report

Background

Texas Motor Speedway is a speedway located in the northernmost portion of the U.S. city of Fort Worth, Texas – the portion located in Denton County, Texas. The track measures  around and is banked 24 degrees in the turns, and is of the oval design, where the front straightaway juts outward slightly. The track layout is similar to Atlanta Motor Speedway and Charlotte Motor Speedway (formerly Lowe's Motor Speedway). The track is owned by Speedway Motorsports, Inc., the same company that owns Atlanta and Charlotte Motor Speedways, as well as the short-track Bristol Motor Speedway.

Entry list
 (i) denotes driver who are ineligible for series driver points.
 (R) denotes rookie driver.

Practice

First practice

Final practice

Qualifying

Qualifying results

Race

Stage results

Stage One
Laps: 85

Stage Two
Laps: 85

Final stage results

Stage Three
Laps: 164

Race statistics
 Lead changes: 26 among 11 different drivers
 Cautions/Laps: 11 for 56
 Red flags: 0
 Time of race: 3 hours, 44 minutes and 44 seconds
 Average speed:

Media

Television
NBC Sports covered the race on the television side. Rick Allen, Two–time Texas winner Jeff Burton, Steve Letarte and 2000 Texas winner Dale Earnhardt Jr. had the call in the booth for the race. Dave Burns, Marty Snider and Kelli Stavast reported from pit lane during the race.

Radio
PRN covered their final 2019 broadcast, which was simulcast on Sirius XM NASCAR Radio. Doug Rice & Mark Garrow covered the action for PRN when the field raced down the front straightaway. Doug Turnbull covered the action for PRN from a platform outside of Turns 1 &2, & Pat Patterson covered the action from a platform outside of Turns 3 &4 for PRN. Brad Gillie, Brett McMillan, Wendy Venturini and Heather DeBeaux had the call from pit lane for PRN.

Standings after the race

Manufacturers' Championship standings

Note: Only the first 16 positions are included for the driver standings.

References

AAA Texas 500
AAA Texas 500
NASCAR races at Texas Motor Speedway
AAA Texas 500